The 2021 St. George Illawarra Dragons season was the 23rd in the joint venture club's history. The Dragons' men's team competed in the NRL's 2021 Telstra Premiership season. The women's team, was scheduled to play their fourth season in the NRLW's 2021 Telstra Women's Premiership season, however that has since been postponed to 2022.

Squad

Gains and losses

Ladder

Ladder progression

Season results

Pre-season trials

NRL season

Representative honours

References 

St. George Illawarra Dragons seasons
St. George Illawarra Dragons season
2021 NRL Women's season